J. Huston Tavern, also known as the Arrow Rock Tavern and The Old Tavern, is a historic tavern building located at Arrow Rock, Saline County, Missouri. It was built in 1834 by Judge Joseph Huston, and is a 2 1/2-story, Federal style brick building.  A store with a second-floor ballroom was added in 1840. The tavern is the oldest continuously serving restaurant west of the Mississippi River.

It was added to the National Register of Historic Places in 1972. It is located in the Arrow Rock Historic District.

References

External links

Historic American Buildings Survey in Missouri
Individually listed contributing properties to historic districts on the National Register in Missouri
Commercial buildings on the National Register of Historic Places in Missouri
Federal architecture in Missouri
Commercial buildings completed in 1834
Buildings and structures in Saline County, Missouri
National Register of Historic Places in Saline County, Missouri